Zlatko "Cico" Kranjčar (15 November 1956 – 1 March 2021) was a Croatian professional football manager and player. 

Kranjčar started his career as a player with Dinamo Zagreb where he won the Yugoslav First League in 1981–82, then Yugoslav Cup twice in 1980 and 1983. He later became the manager of the club which is now part of independent Croatia and went on to win Croatian First League in 1995–96 and 1997–98 and the Croatian Cup twice in 1996 and 1998.

Kranjčar also played for Rapid Wien where he had success winning the Austrian Bundesliga twice in 1986–87 and 1987–88; the Austrian Cup in 1984, 1985 and 1987; and the Austrian Supercup in 1986, 1987 and 1988.

Kranjčar was appointed manager of the Croatia national team and took them to the 2006 World Cup. He also had a short spell with the Montenegro national team. In 2009 he went to Iran and managed Persepolis. While there he had two spells with Sepahan where he went on to win the Iran Pro League in 2011–12 and the Hazfi Cup in 2012–13.

Playing career

Club
Kranjčar started to play for Dinamo Zagreb at the age of 10 in 1966 and stayed at the club until 1983. He debuted for the first team on 3 March 1974, aged 17, in a match against Hajduk Split. He played as a striker and quickly became one of the most popular players of the club. He appeared in a total of 556 matches for Dinamo, including friendlies, and scored a total of 256 goals, of which 98 were in the Yugoslav First League. With Dinamo, Kranjčar won the 1981–82 Yugoslav First League, the first one for the club in 24 years, and two Yugoslav Cups in 1980 and 1983. He then transferred to Austrian club Rapid Wien for which he played until 1990. With the club he won the Austrian Championship twice and even made it to the Cup Winners’ Cup final in 1985. The last club in his playing career was VSE St. Pölten for which he played for two months in late 1990.

International
Kranjčar made his debut for Yugoslavia in a January 1977 friendly match away against Colombia, coming on as a 60th-minute substitute for Vladimir Petrović, and earned a total of 11 caps, scoring 3 goals. His final international was a November 1983 friendly against France.

He was also capped twice and scored one goal for the Croatia national team and is notable as the first team captain of the Croatian team in their first international match against the United States on 17 October 1990 in Zagreb. Both games were unofficial however, since Croatia was still part of Yugoslavia at the time.

Managerial career

Early years
Kranjčar started his coaching career in 1991 as an advisor at Austria Klagenfurt. From 1992 until 1994 he coached Croatian club Segesta and in 1994 he transferred to Croatia Zagreb, where he won the Croatian Championship and Cup in his first season. In 1996 he returned to Austria to coach FC Linz. A year later he was back in Croatia where he coached the clubs Slaven Belupo, Segesta (again) and Samobor. In 1998 he came back to Croatia Zagreb and led the club to another win in both the Croatian Championship and Cup as well as to an appearance in the UEFA Champions League. In 1999 he started to coach Egyptian club Al-Masry and in 2000 he went on to coach Slovenian club NK Mura, where he also stayed for one season. In 2002, he became the Croatian championship winner with NK Zagreb.

Croatia
After Croatia failed to advance through the group stage at the UEFA Euro 2004, Kranjčar was chosen to replace Otto Barić as the national team's coach for the next two years. He went on to lead Croatia in a total of 25 international matches between August 2004 and June 2006. Under his guidance, the team finished top of their group in the 2006 FIFA World Cup qualifying, staying undefeated by recording seven wins and three draws in their ten qualifying matches. At the 2006 FIFA World Cup finals, however, they failed to reach the knock-out stages after losing once and drawing twice in their three group matches. Due to this, the Croatian Football Federation decided not to renew Kranjčar's expiring contract on 14 July 2006.

In June 2007, Kranjčar took over a coaching position with the United Arab Emirates team Al-Shaab, but was sacked in December after a dispute with the board about player selection. On 22 April 2009, he was named as the new head coach of DAC 1904 Dunajská Streda.

Persepolis
On 1 July 2009, he was appointed head coach of Iran Pro League side Persepolis after he signed a two year contract. Despite having good players such as Karim Bagheri, Misagh Memarzadeh, Sepehr Heidari, Shpejtim Arifi and Sheys Rezaei, Persepolis was unsuccessful in the first weeks of the season. He was sacked by the club chairman Habib Kashani on 25 September 2009 after his loss against Paykan but he was returned to the club after the support of the technical committee five days later.

His contract was renewed until the end of half season. He was replaced by Ali Daei on 28 December 2009 after his contract expired.

Montenegro
In February 2010 he took over the Montenegro national team from Zoran Filipović, having a very poor start with two defeats in two friendly matches against Macedonia away and Albania at home and third defeat against Norway with which Filipović had a stunning 3–1 home victory. He was dismissed on 8 September 2011, following Montenegro's defeat to Wales in a UEFA Euro 2012 qualifier six days earlier. The Montenegro Football Federation said he was sacked due to alcohol addiction.

Sepahan
Kranjčar signed a two-year contract with Iran Pro League three-time champion, Sepahan on 28 October 2011 replacing his compatriot Luka Bonačić. In his first match as Sepahan head coach, Sepahan had a 0–0 draw with Persepolis which Kranjčar coached in 2009.

On 11 May 2012, Sepahan clinched the title for the fourth time (three in a row) and first under Kranjčar with a draw against Mes Sarcheshmeh. They also defeated Esteghlal in the Round of 16 of the ACL and reached the Quarter-finals.

Kranjčar's side faced Foolad in the Round of 32 of the Hazfi Cup on 13 December 2012 which defeated them 2–1 at Isfahan. They defeated Mes Rafsanjan, Sanat Naft and Esteghlal in next matches to reach the final. In final, his side won against Persepolis 4–2 on penalties to crown their 4th domestic cup title in last ten years. In his second season as Sepahan head coach, his side finished in third place, three points behind winner, Esteghlal.

On 8 September 2014, Kranjčar resigned as Sepahan manager for an unannounced reason. He was replaced by Hossein Faraki.

Al-Ahli
On 7 February 2015, Kranjčar was named as the new manager of Doha-based club Al-Ahli, signing a two-year contract. He was sacked in February 2016 after a run of poor results.

Return to Sepahan
On 17 March 2017, Kranjčar returned to Iranian club Sepahan signing a two-year contract. However, on 20 January 2018 after a series of bad results, Kranjčar parted ways with them by mutual consent to leave Isfahan.

Iran U23

On 29 April 2018, Kranjčar became the head coach of the Iran national under-23 team, signing a contract until 2020.

Personal life
Kranjčar was married in 1983 and had a son, Niko, who is also a professional footballer. He was fluent in German.

On 1 March 2021, Kranjčar died at the age of 64 after a short but severe illness. His health deteriorated in Zadar, where he ended up in hospital. He was urgently transferred to Zagreb but doctors were unable to save his life.

Career statistics

Club

International

International goals
Scores and results list Yugoslavia's and Croatia's goal tally first.

Managerial statistics

Source: hrnogomet.com

Honours

Player
Dinamo Zagreb
Yugoslav First League: 1981–82
Yugoslav Cup: 1980, 1983
Yugoslav Youth Cup: 1973

Rapid Wien
Austrian Bundesliga: 1986–87, 1987–88
Austrian Cup: 1984, 1985, 1987
Austrian Supercup: 1986, 1987, 1988

Individual
Dinamo Zagreb all time XI

Manager
Dinamo Zagreb
Croatian First League: 1995–96, 1997–98
Croatian Cup: 1996, 1998

NK Zagreb
Croatian First League: 2001–02

Sepahan
Iran Pro League: 2011–12
Hazfi Cup: 2012–13

Individual
Franjo Bučar State Award for Sport: 2005
Iranian Manager of the Year: 2012
Iran Football Federation Award Coach of the Season: 2012–13

References

External links

 
 

1956 births
2021 deaths
Footballers from Zagreb
Association football forwards
Yugoslav footballers
Yugoslavia international footballers
Croatian footballers
Croatia international footballers
Dual internationalists (football)
GNK Dinamo Zagreb players
SK Rapid Wien players
SKN St. Pölten players
Yugoslav First League players
Austrian Football Bundesliga players
Yugoslav expatriate footballers
Expatriate footballers in Austria
Yugoslav expatriate sportspeople in Austria
Croatian football managers
2006 FIFA World Cup managers
FC Kärnten managers
HNK Segesta managers
GNK Dinamo Zagreb managers
FC Linz managers
NK Slaven Belupo managers
Al Masry SC managers
ND Mura 05 managers
NK Marsonia managers
NK Zagreb managers
HNK Rijeka managers
Croatia national football team managers
NK Sesvete managers
Al-Shaab CSC managers
FC DAC 1904 Dunajská Streda managers
Persepolis F.C. managers
Montenegro national football team managers
Sepahan S.C. managers
Al Ahli SC (Doha) managers
Croatian Football League managers
Egyptian Premier League managers
UAE Pro League managers
Slovak Super Liga managers
Persian Gulf Pro League managers
Qatar Stars League managers
Croatian expatriate football managers
Expatriate football managers in Austria
Croatian expatriate sportspeople in Austria
Expatriate football managers in Egypt
Croatian expatriate sportspeople in Egypt
Expatriate football managers in Slovenia
Croatian expatriate sportspeople in Slovenia
Expatriate football managers in the United Arab Emirates
Croatian expatriate sportspeople in the United Arab Emirates
Expatriate football managers in Slovakia
Croatian expatriate sportspeople in Slovakia
Expatriate football managers in Iran
Croatian expatriate sportspeople in Iran
Expatriate football managers in Montenegro
Croatian expatriate sportspeople in Montenegro
Expatriate football managers in Qatar
Croatian expatriate sportspeople in Qatar
Franjo Bučar Award winners